The 11th Lambda Literary Awards were held in 1999 to honour works of LGBT literature published in 1998.

Special awards

Nominees and winners

External links
 11th Lambda Literary Awards

Lambda Literary Awards
Lambda
Lists of LGBT-related award winners and nominees
1999 in LGBT history
1999 awards in the United States